Dario Ambrosini (7 March 1918 in Cesena - 14 July 1951 in Albi) was an Italian Grand Prix motorcycle road racer who competed for the Benelli factory racing team. He finished second to Bruno Ruffo in the inaugural FIM 250cc world championship in 1949. He returned in 1950 and claimed the 250cc world championship with three victories including one at the 1950 Isle of Man TT. Ambrosini was killed during official practice for the 1951 French Grand Prix at Albi.

Motorcycle Grand Prix results 
1949 point system

Points system from 1950 to 1968

5 best results were counted up until 1955.

(key) (Races in italics indicate fastest lap)

References 

1918 births
1951 deaths
People from Cesena
Italian motorcycle racers
250cc World Championship riders
Isle of Man TT riders
Motorcycle racers who died while racing
Sport deaths in France
Sportspeople from the Province of Forlì-Cesena
250cc World Riders' Champions